Events in the year 1914 in Brazil.

Incumbents

Federal government 
 President: Marshal Hermes da Fonseca (until 14 November); Venceslau Brás (from 15 November)
 Vice President: Venceslau Brás (until 14 November); Urbano Santos da Costa Araújo (from 15 November)

Governors
 Alagoas: Clodoaldo da Fonseca
 Amazonas: Jônatas de Freitas Pedrosa
 Bahia: José Joaquim Seabra
 Ceará: 
 till 14 March: Marcos Franco Rabelo
 15 March - 14 June: Fernando Setembrino de Carvalho
 from 14 June: Benjamin Liberato Barroso
 Goiás:
 until 6 July: Olegário Herculano da Silva Pinto
 from 6 July: Salatiel Simões de Lima
 Maranhão:
 till 1 March: Luís Antônio Domingues da Silva
 1 March - 26 April: Afonso Gifwning de Matos
 from 26 April: Herculano Nina Parga
 Mato Grosso: Joaquim Augusto da Costa Marques
 Minas Gerais: 
 till 7 September: Júlio Bueno Brandão
 from 7 September: Delfim Moreira
 Pará: Enéas Martins
 Paraíba: João Castro Pinto
 Paraná: Carlos Cavalcanti de Albuquerque
 Pernambuco: Emídio Dantas Barreto
 Piaui: Miguel de Paiva Rosa
 Rio Grande do Norte: Joaquim Ferreira Chaves
 Rio Grande do Sul: Antônio Augusto Borges de Medeiros
 Santa Catarina:
 São Paulo: 
 Sergipe:

Vice governors 
 Rio Grande do Norte:
 São Paulo:

Events 
1 March - In the presidential election, incumbent Vice-President Venceslau Brás, of the Mineiro Republican Party, receives 91.6% of the vote.
20 May - Brazil participates in the Niagara Falls peace conference, in at attempt to avoid war between the United States and Mexico.
8 June - The Brazilian Football Confederation is founded, with Álvaro Zamith as its first president.  The Brazilian Olympic Committee is founded on the same day.

Births 
14 March - Abdias do Nascimento, Afro-Brazilian scholar, artist, and politician (died 2011)
18 May - Cacilda Borges Barbosa, pianist, conductor and composer (died 2010) 
29 May - José Eugênio Corrêa, Bishop of Caratinga 1957-1978 (died 2010)
14 July - Marcelo Damy, physicist (died 2009)

Deaths 
18 June - Sílvio Romero, Condorist" poet, essayist, literary critic, professor and journalist (born 1851)
12 November - Augusto dos Anjos, poet and academic (born 1884;pneumonia)

See also 
1914 in Brazilian football

References 

 
1910s in Brazil
Brazil
Years of the 20th century in Brazil
Brazil